Juan Leone Cruz (born June 13, 1987) is an American soccer player who played for Austin Aztex in the USL Pro.

Career

College and Amateur
Cruz made a total of 67 appearances for the SMU Mustangs and finished with nine goals and five assists.

Cruz also played in the USL Premier Development League for the Austin Lightning, the DFW Tornados, the Laredo Heat and the Austin Aztex U23. Cruz won two PDL National Championships, the first in 2007 (Laredo) and the second in 2013 (Austin).

Professional
On January 13, 2011, Cruz was drafted in the second round (21st overall) of the 2011 MLS SuperDraft by Seattle Sounders FC.

On March 1, 2012, Real Salt Lake signed Cruz to a professional contract.

After a NASL championship season with the San Antonio Scorpions, Cruz re-signed with the Aztex on January 29, 2015.

References

External links
 
 Real Salt Lake profile
 SMU Mustangs bio

1987 births
Living people
American soccer players
American sportspeople of Mexican descent
Association football defenders
Austin Aztex players
Austin Aztex U23 players
Austin Lightning players
DFW Tornados players
Laredo Heat players
North American Soccer League players
People from Round Rock, Texas
Real Salt Lake players
San Antonio Scorpions players
Seattle Sounders FC draft picks
SMU Mustangs men's soccer players
Soccer players from Texas
USL Championship players
USL League Two players